Grant Union High School is a public high school in John Day, Oregon, United States.

Academics
In 2008, 96% of the school's seniors received a high school diploma. Of 49 students, 47 graduated, none dropped out, and two received a modified diploma.

Notable alumni
 Denny Smith, former Congressman

References

High schools in Grant County, Oregon
Public high schools in Oregon
John Day, Oregon